The second use of the TOPS classification Class 21 for locomotives used on the British railway network came through the use of a number of related diesel-hydraulic and diesel-electric locomotives procured following the opening of the Channel Tunnel. The total of 16 locomotives were obtained by two separate operators, with some used for freight, and others to propel service trains and as "Thunderbird" locomotives.

History
In the early 1980s, Maschinenbau Kiel introduced its MaK DE 1002 design of diesel-electric locomotive, which was chosen by Nederlandse Spoorwegen as the basis of its Class 6400 freight locomotive. In 1991, Eurotunnel procured five similar locomotives as its Class 0001, for use both to operate service trains through the Channel Tunnel and as rescue locomotives.

In 2005, Euro Cargo Rail (ECR) was formed as a freight operator in France by English, Welsh and Scottish Railway (EWS). Its initial operations were carried out by a quartet of Vossloh G1206 diesel-hydraulic locomotives. Although these locomotives were intended for use in France, maintenance was planned to be carried out at EWS's depot at Dollands Moor, close to the Eurotunnel terminal at Cheriton. Because the locomotives would be operating on railways in Great Britain, they were allocated numbers in the TOPS system as Class 21. Two similar G1000 locomotives were procured in 2007.

In 2009, Eurotunnel's five locomotives were used extensively for rescue operations following severe snow. As a consequence, the company identified a need to have greater availability of these units, and so procured a pair of Class 6400 locomotives from DB Schenker Nederland in November 2010. At the same time, Eurotunnel registered its locomotives on TOPS - the superficial similarity to the ECR locomotives led to the Eurotunnel units also being assigned as Class 21. Eurotunnel acquired a further three secondhand units from the Netherlands in 2016.

Fleet details

References

21
Bo-Bo locomotives
MaK locomotives
Vossloh locomotives
Standard gauge locomotives of Great Britain
Standard gauge locomotives of France
Diesel-electric locomotives of France
Diesel-electric locomotives of Great Britain
Railway locomotives introduced in 1990
Railway locomotives introduced in 2005